Custer County is the name of six counties in the United States:

 Custer County, Colorado 
 Custer County, Idaho 
 Custer County, Montana 
 Custer County, Nebraska 
 Custer County, Oklahoma 
 Custer County, South Dakota